The 2013 FBD Insurance League was an inter-county and colleges Gaelic football competition in the province of Connacht. As well as the five county teams, three colleges' teams competed: Institute of Technology, Sligo, NUI Galway and Galway-Mayo Institute of Technology (GMIT). Leitrim won for the first time in the competition's history.

Format
The teams are drawn into two groups of four teams. Each team plays the other teams in its group once, earning 2 points for a win and 1 for a draw. The two group winners play in the final. The winners were supposed to play a further game against New York, but this game was never played.

Results

Section A

Sligo 0-14 IT Sligo 0-5
 Galway 0-16 NUI Galway 0-6
Galway 0-16 IT Sligo 1-5 
Sligo 0-14 NUI Galway 1-9
Sligo 0-9 Galway 1-4
IT Sligo 0-15 NUI Galway 0-13

Section B

Leitrim 0-6 Roscommon 0-5
Mayo 2-14 GMIT 0-6
Leitrim 0-9 Mayo 0-8
Roscommon 1-20 GMIT 1-4
Leitrim 0-10 GMIT 1-6
Roscommon 1-7 Mayo 0-10

Final

References

FBD Insurance League
FBD Insurance League